The 2010 Arad Challenger was a professional tennis tournament played on outdoor red clay courts. This was the first edition of the tournament which is part of the 2010 ATP Challenger Tour. It took place in Arad, Romania between 28 June and 4 July 2010.

ATP entrants

Seeds

 Rankings are as of June 21, 2010.

Other entrants
The following players received wildcards into the singles main draw:
  Marius Copil
  Cătălin Gârd
  Vasile-Alexandru Ghilea
  Petru-Alexandru Luncanu

The following player received entry as an alternative:
  Daniel King-Turner

The following players received entry from the qualifying draw:
  Dennis Blömke
  Boris Pašanski
  Marek Semjan
  Franko Škugor

Champions

Singles

 David Guez def.  Benoît Paire, 6–3, 6–1

Doubles

 Daniel Muñoz-De La Nava /  Sergio Pérez-Pérez def.  Franko Škugor /  Ivan Zovko, 6–4, 6–1

References

External links
2010 Arad Challenger at TenisRomania.ro
Twitter Arad Challenger
Facebook Arad Challenger

Arad Challenger
Clay court tennis tournaments
Tennis tournaments in Romania
BRD Arad Challenger
2010 in Romanian tennis